Happy Hour is a sitcom that debuted on Fox in the United States and on CTV in Canada on September 7, 2006. The show starred John Sloan as Henry Beckman, a young man rebuilding his life after losing his girlfriend, his job, and his apartment. The series was produced by married duo Jackie and Jeff Filgo of That '70s Show.

Fox put the show on hiatus in September 2006, and officially canceled it the following May. Thirteen episodes of Happy Hour were made, of which four have aired and nine remain unaired for disappointing ratings. In Brazil the thirteen episodes were aired.

Cast

Episodes

International broadcasts

External links
 

2006 American television series debuts
2006 American television series endings
2000s American sitcoms
English-language television shows
Fox Broadcasting Company original programming
Television series by Warner Bros. Television Studios
Television shows set in Chicago